Otto Reiser (24 December 1884 – 1961) was a German international footballer who played for BTuFC Britannia 1892 and Phönix Karlsruhe. He also won one cap for the German national team in 1911.

References

External links
 

1884 births
1961 deaths
Association football midfielders
German footballers
Germany international footballers
Karlsruher SC players